Duncan Ross (May 15, 1870 – June 30, 1915) was a Canadian publisher, railway contractor, and politician, born in Bruce County, Ontario. He represented the constituency of Yale–Cariboo as a Liberal from 1904 until 1908, when he lost his seat to the Conservative Martin Burrell. His attempt to retake the seat in 1911 failed.

He also served as an alderman in Greenwood, British Columbia.

References
 

Members of the House of Commons of Canada from British Columbia
Liberal Party of Canada MPs
1870 births
1916 deaths